Preity Zinta (born 31 January 1975) is an Indian actress, film producer and entrepreneur who has received several awards for her acting in Hindi films. Her career began in 1998 with Mani Ratnam's acclaimed drama Dil Se.. and the box office hit Soldier. Both films won her the award for Best Female Debut at the 44th Filmfare Awards. Her performance in Dil Se.. also earned her a Best Supporting Actress nomination at the same ceremony, while Soldier won her three more Best Debut awards at other major ceremonies. Zinta received her first Filmfare nomination for Best Actress for her portrayal of a teenage single mother in Kya Kehna. She followed these films with several critically and commercially successful films, such as Mission Kashmir (2000) and Dil Chahta Hai (2001), and her performances in Chori Chori Chupke Chupke (2001), Dil Hai Tumhaara (2002) and Armaan (2003) were praised.

Zinta won several awards for her performance in the romantic comedy-drama Kal Ho Naa Ho, including her first and only Filmfare Award for Best Actress. She went on to star in top-grossing productions in India and abroad, including Koi... Mil Gaya (2003), Veer-Zaara (2004), Salaam Namaste (2005) and Kabhi Alvida Naa Kehna (2006), all of which earned her different nominations at major award ceremonies, which, in addition to Filmfare, include such organisations as Screen, Zee Cine, the International Indian Film Academy (IIFA), and Stardust, among others. After a relatively low phase, she started appearing in arthouse films, known in India as parallel cinema. She played her first international film role in Deepa Mehta's Canadian drama Heaven on Earth (2008, titled Videsh in India). Her portrayal in the film won her the Silver Hugo Award for Best Actress at the Chicago International Film Festival, and she was a Best Actress nominee at several award functions in Canada, including the Genie Awards by the Academy of Canadian Cinema & Television, and the Vancouver Film Critics Circle.

Apart from merit awards for her film performances, Zinta was awarded different non-acting honours at major film award functions. These include IIFA's Style Diva of the Year and Glamorous Star awards. She was named Zee Cine's Queen of Hearts in 2003 and female Superstar of the Year in 2004. In 2009, Zinta was one of five actresses nominated as "Star of the Decade – Female" at the 10th IIFA Awards.
In addition to industry honours, Zinta has received several achievement awards for both her film career and her social activities. In 2003, Zinta became the first recipient of Godfrey's Mind of Steel Award at the annual Red and White Bravery Awards, given to her for the "Courageous Act" of standing against the Mumbai underworld after she became the only witness not to retract in court her earlier statements against the Indian mafia during the 2003 Bharat Shah case. In 2010, the University of East London awarded Zinta with an Honorary Doctorate of Arts in honour of both her cultural contribution and her humanitarian work.

Awards and nominations

Honours and recognitions
2003: Mind of Steel Award Award at Godfrey Phillips National Bravery Awards, given to her for the "Courageous Act" of standing against the Mumbai underworld
2008: GR8! FLO Women Achievers Awards for achievement in films
2009: IIFA-FICCI Frames Awards, among 10 "Most Powerful Entertainers of the Decade"
 2010: Honorary Doctorate of Arts, the University of East London, in honour of her cultural contribution and humanitarian work. Cited as "an international actress, pioneering star of Hindi cinema and devoted humanitarian. Preity has carved a path for women to follow."
 2011: Venice Film Festival, "World Diamond Group Platinum Award for Peoples' Friendship"
 2013: YFLO Young Women Achievers Award for achievement in films

References

Bibliography

External links 
 

Lists of awards received by Indian actor